Alaudinpur  is a village in Kapurthala tehsil in Kapurthala district of Punjab State, India. It is located 10 km away from Kapurthala.  The village is administrated by Sarpanch an elected representative of the village.

Demography 
As of 2011, Alaudinpur has a total number of 239 houses and population of 1171 of which 612 are males while 559 are females according to the report published by Census India in 2011. Literacy rate of Alaudinpur is 73.83%, lower than state average of 75.84%. The population of children under the age of 6 years is 128 which is 10.93% of total population of Alaudinpur, and child sex ratio is approximately 641 lower than state average of 846.

Population data

Villages in Kapurthala

References

External links
 Villages in Kapurthala

Villages in Kapurthala district